Otago is a rural residential locality in the local government areas (LGA) of Brighton and Clarence in the Hobart LGA region of Tasmania. The 2016 census recorded a population of 554 for the state suburb of Otago.
It is a suburb of Hobart, located on the shores of Otago Bay.

History 
Otago was gazetted as a locality in 1977. Previously gazetted as Gregson, after Thomas Gregson, the second Premier of Tasmania, the name was changed in 1977.

The area takes its name from the iron barque Otago, the only command of the author Joseph Conrad, which was dismantled at a shipbreaking establishment that operated at the bay (formerly known simply as part of Old Beach) between the 1920s and 1960s.  The remains of Otago (beached there in 1931) and a steel river steamer Westralian (beached in 1937) can still be seen on the beach. The name of the boat was in turn taken from the Otago region of New Zealand.

Geography
The waters of the River Derwent form the western and southern boundaries.

Road infrastructure 
Route B32 (East Derwent Highway) passes through from north-west to south-east.

References

Localities of City of Clarence
Towns in Tasmania
Localities of Brighton Council (Tasmania)